Banking in Belgium has, as of 11 October 2008, an average leverage ratio (assets/net worth) of 33 to 1, while the banks's short-term liabilities are equal to 285% of the Belgian GDP or 367% of its national debt.

See also 
 2008 Belgian financial crisis
 National Bank of Belgium

References